The Amateurs' Super Cup Greece introduced from the 2013–14 season and is a single final played on a neutral ground, which sets the Hellenic Football Federation. In Amateurs' Super Cup Greece compete the winning team of Gamma Ethniki Cup with the winning team of Greek Football Amateur Cup for the emergence of the Greek Football Amateur Cup Winner for the season.

The finals

See also
Gamma Ethniki Cup
Greek Football Amateur Cup

References

External links
epo.gr

Football cup competitions in Greece
Recurring sporting events established in 2013
2013 establishments in Greece